Depigmentation is the lightening of the skin or loss of pigment. Depigmentation of the skin can be caused by a number of local and systemic conditions. The pigment loss can be partial (injury to the skin) or complete (caused by vitiligo). It can be temporary (from tinea versicolor) or permanent (from albinism).

Most commonly, depigmentation of the skin is linked to people born with vitiligo, which produces differing areas of light and dark skin. Monobenzone also causes skin depigmentation.

Increasingly, people who are not afflicted with vitiligo experiment with lower concentrations of monobenzone creams in the hope of lightening their skin tone evenly. An alternate method of lightening is to use the chemical mequinol over an extended period of time. Both monobenzone and mequinol produce dramatic skin whitening, but react very differently. Mequinol leaves the skin looking extremely pale. However, tanning is still possible. It is important to notice that the skin will not go back to its original color after the none treatment of mequinol. Mequinol should not be used by people that are allergic to any ingredient in mequinol; people that are pregnant; people that have eczema, irritated or inflamed skin; people that have an increased number of white blood cells or people that are sensitive to sunlight or must be outside for prolonged periods of time. Mequinol is used in Europe in concentrations ranging from 2-20% and is approved in many countries for the treatment of solar lentigines. Monobenzone applied topically completely removes pigment in the long term and vigorous sun-safety must to be adhered to for life to avoid severe sun burn and melanomas. People using monobenzone without previously having vitiligo do so because standard products containing hydroquinone or other lightening agents are not effective for their skin and due to price and active ingredient strength. However, monobenzone is not recommended for skin conditions other than vitiligo.

For stubborn pigmented lesions the Q-switched ruby laser, cryotherapy or TCA peels can be used to ensure the skin remains pigment-free.

See also
 Skin whitening

References

Disturbances of pigmentation